PGM Précision (styled as PGM PRECISION) is a French company manufacturing high-precision rifles for military, law enforcement and sporting usages.

Models include:
 PGM Hécate II (12.7×99mm NATO / .50 BMG), .416 Barrett/10.6×83mm
 PGM 338 (.338 Lapua Magnum / 8.6×70mm)
 PGM Ultima Ratio (7.62×51mm NATO as main military chambering).300 Savage, 7mm-08 Remington, .260 Remington, 6.5×47mm Lapua and 6mm Norma BR on special request

References

External links
 

Firearm manufacturers of France
Companies based in Auvergne-Rhône-Alpes
French brands